Bosanska Bojna  is a village in Bosnia and Herzegovina.

On 5 October 2014 it was reported that the Bosniak Islamist Bilal Bosnić had acquired several houses in the village. Bosnić is currently under arrest as part of the anti-terrorist operation Akcija Damask, intended to prevent recruitment for jihadist groups and spreading of Islamic extremism in Bosnia and Herzegovina.

Demographics 
According to the 2013 census, its population was 691.

References

Populated places in Velika Kladuša